Eupodium is a genus of ferns in the family Marattiaceae native to the Neotropics. Traditionally, many taxonomists have included Eupodium within the genus Marattia (along with Ptisana). However, molecular phylogenetic studies and morphological studies of extant and fossil taxa support the recognition of Eupodium as a lineage distinct from Marattia. Morphologically, Eupodium was thought to be distinct among the Marattiaceae in only having one frond at a time (occasionally two), bearing awns along veins, and having stalked synangia (clusters of sporangia that have become fused in development). However, recent phylogenetic work found that an additional species native to Brazil, Eupodium cicutifolium, which lacks these characters, is also genetically in Eupodium, making the genus challenging to distinguish morphologically. Eupodium cicutifolium does occasionally have short-stalked synangia, and has spinulose spores like the other Eupodium species, but is otherwise easily mistaken for a Marattia or Ptisana. The genus currently has four recognized species.

The basal chromosome number for this genus is unknown. The type species is Eupodium kaulfussii.

Phylogeny
Phylogeny of Eupodium

The genus includes the following species: 
 Eupodium cicutifolium (Kaulf.) Lehtonen (Brazil, northern Argentina)
 Eupodium kaulfussii (J.Sm.) J.Sm. (Brazil)
 Eupodium laeve (Sm.) Murdock (Cuba, Hispaniola, Puerto Rico)
 Eupodium pittieri (Maxon) Christenh. (Central America, Colombia, Ecuador, Peru, Bolivia, Venezuela, Trinidad)

References

Marattiidae
Fern genera